The Stoglav Synod (also translated as Hundred Chapter Synod or Council of a Hundred Chapters) was a church council (sobor)  held in Moscow in 1551, with the participation of  Tsar Ivan IV, Metropolitan Macarius, and representatives of the Boyar Duma.  It convened in January and February 1551, with some final sessions as late as May of that year. Its decrees are known as the Stoglav.

In 1551, the Tsar summoned a synod of the Russian Church to discuss the ritual practices that had grown up in Russia which did not conform with those of the Greek Church. The decrees issued by the Synod, known as the Stoglav, rule that they were all correct. This unilaterial decision shocked many of the Orthodox. The monks of Athos protested and the Russian monks there regarded the decisions of the synods as invalid.

Decisions 

The Stoglav Synod was called under the government’s initiative which aspired to support the church in struggle against anti-feudal heretical movements and simultaneously to subordinate its secular authority.

The Stoglav Synod proclaimed the inviolability of church properties and the exclusive jurisdiction of church courts over ecclesiastical matters. At the demand of the church hierarchy the government cancelled the tsar's jurisdiction over ecclesiastics. In exchange, members of the Stoglav Synod made concessions to the government in a number of other areas (prohibition for monasteries to found new large villages in cities, etc.).

By decisions of the Stoglav Synod, church ceremonies and duties in the whole territory of Russia were unified, and norms of church life were regulated with the purpose of increasing the educational and moral level of the clergy to ensure they would correctly fulfill their duties, such as creation of schools for preparation of priests. In particular, the Sobor forbade the tradition of polyphony and other shortcuts in liturgy. 

The church authorities' control over the activities of book writers, icon painters, and others, was firmly established.

The decisions of the Stoglav Synod that approved the native Russian rituals at the expense of those accepted in Greece and other Orthodox countries were cancelled by the Moscow Sobor of 1666–1667, leading to a great schism of the Russian church known as the Raskol.

Church code 

The synod produced a church code named The Synodal Code of the Russian Orthodox Church Synod. It was phrased as a record of questions of the Tsar to the clergy with their answers. By the end of the 16th century the text of the Code was divided into 100 chapters (or "Sto glav" in Russian), and had become commonly referred to as the Stoglav. Accordingly, since these times the Sobor acquired the name "Stoglav Synod".  The Stoglav was the basic code of canon law as well as a guide to the  everyday life of the Muscovite clergy. There are many hand-written editions of the "Stoglav".

References

16th-century church councils
Russian Orthodox Church in Russia
1551 in Russia
History of the Russian Orthodox Church
Eastern Orthodox Church councils